Exponent II is a quarterly periodical, the longest-running independent publication for Latter-day Saint women. At its launch, by a women's group in Massachusetts in 1974, it described itself as a "spiritual descendent" of the Woman's Exponent, founded 100 years earlier. A print edition remains available, while the journal has also been published online since 2007. The Exponent II organization also runs a program of annual residential retreats since the 1980s, and supports a blog, The Exponent.

History

Following the consolidation of the Relief Society budget into the central LDS Church budget, and of the Relief Society Magazine into the general church journal, the Ensign, in 1970, an independent publication called Exponent II was started in 1974 by several Cambridge, Massachusetts-area Mormon women, including Laurel Thatcher Ulrich, Claudia Bushman, Carrell Hilton Sheldon, Judy Dushku and Sue Booth-Forbes. This journal had two inspirations, one being the 1972 finding of a run of the Woman's Exponent in the Widener Library of Harvard University, and the other being a suggestion by one of the LDS Church leaders in the Boston area, historian Richard Bushman.  The group had previously produced a book, Mormon Sisters: Women in Early Utah, partly based on courses they had designed for and presented at the local LDS Institute, and some had previously worked together on a women-focused issue of Dialogue and, as a Cambridge Ward Relief Society project, a guide to Boston.  The group had also held two gala dinners in honour of the Woman's Exponent, the first with Maureen Ursenbach Beecher as keynote speaker, on Eliza R. Snow.

The early production encouraged by the official LDS Church Historian, Leonard Arrington and was aided by a small grant from the Mormon History Association to the group for library and copying expenses, and was done in the homes of group members.  The journal is sometimes characterised as related to the New Mormon history movement.

The first edition - which carried a banner headline reading "Am I Not a Woman and a Sister?" - offered articles on the Equal Rights Amendment, poetry, profiles of female Mormon civic leaders, scholars and entrepreneurs, and notices of study groups and retreats. Following initial publication, some concerns were expressed to Claudia Bushman by a family friend who was also an assistant to the Quorum of the Twelve, and more later by a former Boston Stake President - then a member of the Quorum - with the result that Bushman stepped down as editor and was succeeded by Nancy Dredge.

The women formed a non-profit organization with no official relation to the LDS Church, at first incorporated as Mormon Sisters, Inc., later Exponent II, Inc., which continues in existence.  During the 1970s, according to Alice Colton Smith, a member of the Relief Society General Board at the time, members of the Board were not permitted to subscribe to Exponent II, yet she and a few others did so under the names of their husbands.

The magazine has been published online since 2007.

A 40th anniversary event was held in Boston in 2014, attended by 25 of the 1974 group, and current leaders of the Exponent II organization.

In 2017 the Board of Exponent II announced that a former treasurer (2012 to 2017) had misappropriated funds.  In December 2018 the scale of the embezzlement was revealed to be in excess of a net 100,000 US dollars, with over 191,000 dollars taken in over 600 transactions, and over 84,000 returned before and after discovery.  The former treasurer was investigated by the FBI, prosecuted, and sentenced to prison in 2019, and new financial safeguards were put in place.

Goals and approach
The journal launched with twin platforms of Mormonism and feminism, and while it continues to focus on the concerns and experiences of some Mormon women from a feminist perspective, it modified its initial goals over time.  As of 1984, for example, it summarized its aims as publication on topics of concern to women, and of interest to all, on an "open forum" basis, in a variety of writing forms, and predominantly Mormon-orientated; guidelines were included for both general writing and for poetry.  The periodical aims to be open and non-judgmental, and editorially independent of the LDS Church authorities. While the Church takes no official position on the independent publication, the periodical was apparently described at a 1974 meeting of the Quorum of the Twelve as "Claudia Bushman’s Women’s Lib magazine." Some key concerns of the magazine have been summarized as the struggles of women with modern life's demands, including those of family, and the roles and ways of living for women, sometimes in contrast to traditional perceptions.

Publication, staffing and circulation
Exponent II is published in tabloid or magazine format, quarterly.  The newspaper grew rapidly upon launch, reaching over 4,000 subscribers within its first year, from all US states, and abroad, beating a target of 500.

As of 2021 the role of Editor-in-Chief is held by Rachel Rueckert, in succession to Claudia Bushman (1974-1975), Nancy T. Dredge (1975-1981 and 2000-2009), Susan E. Howe (1981–1984), Susan Paxman (1984-1997), Jenny Atkinson (1997-2000), co-editors Aimee Evans Hickman and Emily Clyde Curtis (2010-2016), and Margaret Olsen Hemming (2016-2021).

There is also a Managing Editor overseeing production, a post held since 2021 by Carol Ann Litster Young, and editors for Art, Layout and specific sections.  From the beginning, a very popular section has been the Sisters Speak column, where a question is posed, and debated by readers writing in.  Artwork, especially for the cover, has been produced by members of the production group, but also by other Mormon women.  Some issues have listed more than 40 volunteer staff in various roles.

The periodical is sold on a subscription basis, in both print and online forms, and single issues from 2014 onwards can also be purchased (some earlier issues can be accessed free).  It has ranged in pagination from 16 to 40 pages.

Archive
A substantial digital archive of earlier Exponent II issues in scanned form is available, free of charge, online.  In addition, the longest-serving editor, Susan Paxman, deposited a set of records related to the periodical's workings from 1977 to 1990, with Brigham Young University in Provo, Utah.

Exponent II retreats
The Exponent II organization has conducted annual residential retreats in the eastern US since the 1980s, where members and others can debate issues and share experiences.  The events are popular - sometimes selling out within a day - and often oversubscribed.

Blog
With the blessing of the Exponent II editorial board, Caroline Kline, Jana Remy and Deborah Farmer established a related blog called The Exponent in January 2005. In 2023 the blog was brought onto the mail Exponent II website, thus fully integrating the blog as one of the three pillars of Exponent II. More than two dozen writers regularly write for the blog, and it includes Relief Society lesson materials written from a Mormon feminist perspective.

Other publications
The Exponent II organization has also produced, and sold, some supplementary items.  These have included a coloring book with full page biographies of 25 Mormon women, "Illuminating Ladies," "Habits of Being: Mormon Women's Material Culture," a book of essays and poetry, with authors including Jana Riess, Linda Kimball and Laurel Thatcher Ulrich, and a set of Mormon feminist stickers.  Also sold is the book "All God's Critters Got a Place in the Choir" by Laurel Thatcher Ulich and Emma Lou Thayne.

Governance
Exponent II is overseen by its Board, led by a President, Vice-President and Treasurer, and including the Editor-in-Chief, Managing Editor, two representatives of the Blog and the Retreats Coordinator.  There is also a panel of Emeritus Board Members, including Laurel Thatcher Ulrich and Judy Dushku.

See also

List of Latter Day Saint periodicals

References

Footnotes

External links
Exponent II Website The Exponent Website
Exponent II scans via BYU's repository on archive.org.
Woman's Exponent (PDF scans) courtesy of the L. Tom Perry Special Collections, Harold B. Lee Library, Brigham Young University.
 
 .
 

1974 establishments in Massachusetts
Feminism in the United States
Feminist magazines
Exponent II
Magazines established in 1974
Magazines published in Massachusetts
Mormon studies journals
Quarterly magazines published in the United States
Women's magazines published in the United States
History of women in Massachusetts
Mormonism and women